Minatitlán is a municipality of the Mexican state of Colima.  Its municipal seat is the city of Minatitlán, Colima.  Its principal economic activities are farming, ranching and mining.  Minatitlán borders the state of Jalisco to the northwest, the municipality of Manzanillo to the southwest, and the municipalities of Coquimatlán, Villa de Álvarez, and Comala to the southeast.

The municipality is Mexico's largest single source of iron ore.

Climate

References

External links
  Minatitlán, Colima Enciclopedia de los Municipios de México, INAFED
  Ayuntamiento de Minatitlán, Colima municipal government website.

Municipalities of Colima

es:Minatitlán (Colima)